Dawei (Tavoy) is a city in Myanmar. Associated locations and concepts include:
Dawei Township, the political division containing the city
Dawei District, the political division containing the township
Dawei Airport, the airport serving the city of Dawei
Dawei River, the river passing through the city of Dawei
Dawei people, the native inhabitants of this region
Tavoyan language, either a dialect of Burmese or a separate language of the same language family.

Dawei may also be the transcription of various Chinese given names; people with the given name Dawei include:
Li Dawei, Chinese author
Tong Dawei, Chinese actor
Wu Dawei, Vice Foreign Minister of the People's Republic of China

Dawei is also the Chinese transcription of David.

Dawei may also refer to:
Afrocarpus dawei, an evergreen coniferous tree native to the East African highlands